Ever since the 2007 municipal reform, Venstre had held the mayor's position in Stevns Municipality. Depsite, only winning 4 seats, 2 less than largest party Social Democrats, in the 2017 election, they had manage to secure the mayor's position.

In this election, the Social Democrats would lose a seat while Venstre would gain a seat, making them equally large for the first time. However, local party Nyt Stevns won 2 seats, and could be decisive, as no bloc had a majority themselves. However, Venstre surprisingly, without citing exactly why, decided to support Henning Urban Dam from the Social Democrats as mayor. This deal included Anette Mortensen from Venstre becoming deputy mayor.

Electoral system
For elections to Danish municipalities, a number varying from 9 to 31 are chosen to be elected to the municipal council. The seats are then allocated using the D'Hondt method and a closed list proportional representation.
Stevns Municipality had 19 seats in 2021

Unlike in Danish General Elections, in elections to municipal councils, electoral alliances are allowed.

Electoral alliances  

Electoral Alliance 1

Electoral Alliance 2

Results

Notes

References 

Stevns